Andreas Buder (born 22 May 1979 in Scheibbs) is a retired Austrian alpine skier.

External links
 
 
 

1979 births
Living people
Austrian male alpine skiers
People from Scheibbs District
Sportspeople from Lower Austria
21st-century Austrian people